The Prison Hospital of Tirana is a prison in Tirana, Albania. It was established in 1930. It was closed under the Communist regime, but was reopened in 1998.

References

Prisons in Albania
Buildings and structures in Tirana
1930 establishments in Albania
1998 establishments in Albania
Prison healthcare
1945 disestablishments in Albania
Prison hospitals
Hospitals established in 1930